Lu Pau-ching is a Taiwanese politician has served as the Deputy Minister of Health and Welfare of Taiwan since 20 May 2016.

Early life
Lu did her bachelor's and master's degree in sociology from National Taiwan University in 1977 and 1979 respectively. She then obtained her master's and doctoral degree in social work and social work and sociology from University of Michigan in the United States in 1985 and 1990 respectively.

Academic careers
At the National Chengchi University, Lu was the associate professor, professor and professor and chairperson of the Department of Sociology in 1994–2002, 2002-2004 and 2004-2006 respectively. In 2006–2009, she was the professor and chairperson of the Graduate Institute of Social Administration and Social Work.

Ministry of Health and Welfare
At a press conference on 18 July 2016, Lu made an announcement on the three major additions to the Long-term Care Plan 2.0 to improve the quantity and quality of care for the elderly and disabled people which will start in 2017.

References

Living people
University of Michigan School of Social Work alumni
Year of birth missing (living people)
National Taiwan University alumni
Taiwanese expatriates in the United States
Academic staff of the National Chengchi University
Taiwanese women physicians
Women government ministers of Taiwan